The Amax Vixen 105 is an Australian homebuilt aircraft that was designed and produced by Amax Engineering of Donvale, Victoria. When it was available the aircraft was supplied as a kit for amateur construction.

Design and development
The Vixen 105 features a strut-braced high-wing, a two-seats-in-side-by-side configuration enclosed cabin with doors, fixed tricycle landing gear or optionally conventional landing gear and a single engine in tractor configuration.

The aircraft is made from composites. The standard engine used is the  Subaru EA81 automotive conversion powerplant.

Optional equipment when the kit was supplied by the factory included wing flaps, long range fuel tanks, wheel pants and sprung steel main landing gear.

The manufacturer estimates the construction time from the supplied kit as 300 hours.

Specifications (Vixen 105)

References

Vixen 105
1990s Australian sport aircraft
Single-engined tractor aircraft
High-wing aircraft
Homebuilt aircraft